
Kościan County is a unit of territorial administration and local government (powiat) in Greater Poland Voivodeship, west-central Poland. It came into being on January 1, 1999, as a result of the Polish local government reforms passed in 1998.

As of 2006 its total population is 77,760, out of which the population of Kościan is 24,102, that of Śmigiel is 5,452, that of Czempiń is 5,135, that of Krzywiń is 1,547, and the rural population is 41,524.

Neighbouring counties
Kościan County is bordered by Poznań County to the north, Śrem County to the east, Gostyń County to the south-east, Leszno County to the south, Wolsztyn County to the west and Grodzisk Wielkopolski County to the north-west.

Administrative division
The county is subdivided into five gminas (one urban, three urban-rural and one rural). These are listed in the following table, in descending order of population.

References
Polish official population figures 2006

 
Land counties of Greater Poland Voivodeship